Cape Bojeador Lighthouse, also known as Burgos Lighthouse, is a cultural heritage structure in Burgos, Ilocos Norte, that was established during the Spanish Colonial period in the Philippines. The lighthouse was first lit on March 30, 1892, and is set high on Vigia de Nagpartian Hill overlooking the scenic Cape Bojeador where early galleons used to sail by. After over 100 years, it still functions and serves ships that enter the Philippine archipelago from the north and guide them safely away from the rocky coast of the town.

The light marks the northwesternmost point in Luzon. The northeasternmost being Cape Engaño Lighthouse on Palaui Island, Santa Ana, Cagayan.

The  octagonal stone tower, the most prominent structure in the vicinity, can be seen from as far away as Pasuquin town in the south and Bangui on the east on a clear day. Contrary to popular belief, it is not the highest-elevated nor tallest lighthouse in the Philippines but the highest-elevated still original and active Spanish era lighthouse in the country.

History

The Cape Bojeador lighthouse was part of the Spanish government's 1857 master plan of illuminating the Philippine archipelago, Plan General de Alumbrado de Maritimo de las costas del Archipelago de Filipino, administered by Inteligencia del Cuerpo de Ingenieros de Caminos, Canales y Puertos. The project commenced with the execution of the lighthouses in the northern and western part of the Philippines and those around Iloilo and Cebu. The 16.3 m tall Faro de Cabo Bojeador was first lit on 30 March 1892.

Design
The lighthouse was first designed by Magin Pers y Perswho in 1887 and was finished by the Lighthouse Service under Guillermo Brockman. Its design is typical of Spanish colonial lighthouses in the Philippines, being of masonry made with bricks widely used and produced in the area. The octagonal tower is topped with a bronze cupola, and the viewing gallery is surrounded by decorative iron grill works.

Lighting apparatus

The lighthouse was originally fitted with first-order Fresnel lens. The intense earthquake of 1990 that hit most of Luzon damaged the lenses and displaced the mechanism alignment of the original first-order apparatus, making it inoperable.

The beam now comes from a modern electric lamp powered by solar panels. The light before was provided by pressurized kerosene lamps very much like "Coleman lamps". In 2005, the old pressure vessels and wicks for the light could still be found in the shed.

Historical markers
Cape Bojeador Lighthouse was declared a National Historical Landmark on August 13, 2004 and a National Cultural Treasure on June 20, 2005 by the Philippine government.

See also

 List of lighthouses in the Philippines

Notes

References

External links

 Cape Bojeador Lighthouse at Lighthouse Depot.
 Lighthouse Stations of Luzon at the Philippine Coast Guard web site.
 Maritime Safety Services Command

Lighthouses completed in 1892
Lighthouses in the Philippines
Buildings and structures in Ilocos Norte
Lighthouse museums
Spanish colonial infrastructure in the Philippines
National Historical Landmarks of the Philippines
National Cultural Treasures of the Philippines
Tourist attractions in Ilocos Norte